Scrobipalpa helmuti is a moth in the family Gelechiidae. It was described by Povolný in 1977. It is found in northern Iran.

There are mixed light to dark ash-grey scales on the forewings, with darker to blackish tips. The hindwings are whitish with ashy-grey scales arranged in lines along the veins and at the margin.

References

Scrobipalpa
Moths described in 1977
Taxa named by Dalibor Povolný